The Pan American Games (also known colloquially as the Pan Am Games) is a continental multi-sport event in the Americas featuring summer sports, in which thousands of athletes participate in a variety of competitions. The competition is held among athletes from nations of the Americas, every four years in the year before the Summer Olympic Games. The only Winter Pan American Games were held in 1990. In 2021, the Junior Pan American Games was held for the first time specifically for young athletes. The Pan American Sports Organization (PASO) is the governing body of the Pan American Games movement, whose structure and actions are defined by the Olympic Charter.

The XVIII Pan American Games were held in Lima from 26 July to 11 August 2019; the XIX Pan American Games will be held in Santiago from 20 October to 5 November 2023. Since the XV Pan American Games in 2007, host cities are contracted to manage both the Pan American and the Parapan American Games, in which athletes with physical disabilities compete with one another. The Parapan American Games are held immediately following the Pan American Games.

The Pan American Games Movement consists of international sports federations (IFs), National Olympic Committees (NOCs) that are recognized by PASO, and organizing committees for each specific Pan American Games. As the decision-making body, PASO is responsible for choosing the host city for each Pan American Games. The host city is responsible for organizing and funding a celebration of the Games consistent with the Olympic Charter (since PASO is affiliated with the IOC, the Olympic Charter) and rules. The Pan American Games program, consisting of the sports to be contested at the Games, is determined by PASO. The celebration of the Games encompasses many rituals and symbols, such as the flag and torch, and the opening and closing ceremonies. Over 5,000 athletes compete at the Pan American Games in 36 sports and nearly 400 events. The first, second, and third-place finishers in each event receive gold, silver, and bronze medals, respectively.

History

Early games
The idea of holding a Pan American Games was first raised at the 1932 Summer Olympics in Los Angeles, where Latin American representatives of the International Olympic Committee (IOC) suggested that a competition among all the countries in the Americas should be created. The first event called the Pan American Games took place in Dallas in 1937 as part of the Greater Texas & Pan-American Exposition, but it attracted so little attention it has never counted in the records of the competition.

At the first Pan American Sports Congress, held in Buenos Aires in 1940, the participants decided that the first games should be held in Buenos Aires in 1942. The plans had to be postponed because of World War II. A second Pan American Sports Congress held in London during the 1948 Summer Olympics reconfirmed Buenos Aires as the choice of host city for the inaugural games, which were held in 1951. The games began on February 25 of that year, and offered 18 sports. Countries that were part of the Commonwealth of Nations such as Canada did not compete at the first Pan American Games. The second games were held in Mexico City, Mexico. Competitions started on March 12 and included 2,583 athletes from 22 countries, competing in 17 sports. The Pan American Games have been held subsequently every four years.

Recent games

While the inaugural 1951 Games hosted 2,513 participants representing 14 nations, the most recent 2019 Pan American Games involved 6,680 competitors from 41 countries. During the games most athletes and officials are housed in the Pan American Games village. This village is intended to be a self-contained home for all the participants. It is furnished with cafeterias, health clinics, and locations for religious expression.

PASO allows nations to compete that do not meet the strict requirements for political sovereignty that other international organizations demand. As a result, colonies and dependencies are permitted to set up their own National Olympic Committees. Examples of this include territories such as Puerto Rico and Bermuda which compete as separate nations despite being legally under the jurisdiction of another power.

Winter Pan American Games

There have been attempts to hold Winter Pan American Games throughout the history of the games, but these have had little success. An initial attempt to hold winter events was made by the organizers of the 1951 Pan American Games in Buenos Aires, who planned to stage winter events later in the year but dropped the idea due to lack of interest. Another difficulty is that the Americas cover two hemispheres, which creates scheduling issues related to reverse seasons.

Lake Placid, New York tried to organize Winter Games in 1959 but, again, not enough countries expressed interest. The plans were eventually cancelled.

In 1988, members of PASO voted to hold the first Pan American Winter Games at Las Leñas, Argentina in September 1989. It was further agreed that Winter Games would be held every four years. Lack of snow however, forced the postponement of the games until 16–22 September 1990 when only eight countries sent 97 athletes to Las Leñas. Of that total, 76 were from just three countries: Argentina, Canada, and the United States. Weather was unseasonably warm and again there was little snow, so only three Alpine Skiing events – the Slalom, Giant Slalom, and Super G were staged. The United States and Canada won all 18 medals.

PASO awarded the second Pan American Winter Games to Santiago, Chile for 1993. The United States warned that it would not take part unless a full schedule of events was held. The Santiago organizing committee eventually gave up on planning the Games after the United States Olympic Committee declined to participate, and the idea has not been revived since.

Junior Pan American Games

On 16 January 2019 PASO announced the creation of the Junior Pan American Games. This event, inspired by the Youth Olympic Games, is exclusive for athletes who are under 21 years of age, with fewer requirements on infrastructure and cost.

For the first edition of the games, Panam Sports accepted candidate cities until 31 January. Cali, Colombia, Santa Ana, El Salvador and Monterrey, Mexico were accepted as candidate cities. Cali, Colombia was chosen as the host city at the Executive Committee in San José, Costa Rica on 27 March 2019.

Pan American Sports Organization 

The Pan American Games Movement encompasses a number of national and international sporting organizations and federations, recognized media partners, athletes, officials, judges, and every other person and institution that agrees to abide by the rules of the Olympic Charter (which is the same as PASO's charter). As the umbrella organization of the Olympic Movement, PASO is responsible for selecting the host city, overseeing the planning of the Pan American Games, updating and approving the sports program, and negotiating sponsorship and broadcasting rights.

The Pan American Games Movement is made of three major elements:
 International Federations (IFs) are the governing bodies that supervise a sport at an international level. For example, the International Federation of Association Football (FIFA) is the IF for football (soccer), and the Fédération Internationale de Volleyball (FIVB) is the international governing body for volleyball. There are currently 36 IFs in the Pan American Games Movement, representing each of the Pan American Games sports.
 National Olympic Committees (NOCs) represent and regulate the Pan American Games movement within each country. For example, the United States Olympic Committee (USOC) is the NOC of the United States. There are currently 41 NOCs recognized by PASO.
 Organizing Committees for the Pan America Games (PAOGs) constitute the temporary committees responsible for the organization of a specific celebration of the Pan American Games. PAOGs are dissolved after each Games, once the final report is delivered to PASO.

Spanish and English are the official languages of the Pan American Games Movement. The other language used at each Pan American Games is the language of the host country. For example: at the 2007 Pan American Games who was held in Brazil, the first language was Brazilian Portuguese.  Every proclamation (such as the announcement of each country during the parade of nations in the opening ceremony) is spoken in these three languages or the main two depending on whether the host country is an English or Spanish speaking country.

Symbols

The Pan American Games Movement uses symbols to represent the ideals embodied in the Pan American Games charter. The Pan American Sports Organization flag displays the PASO logo on a white background. To highlight the close association between the International Olympic Committee and the Pan Am Games, the Olympic Rings were added to the flag in 1988. The flag has been hoisted during each celebration of the Games. The flag was hoisted while the Olympic Hymn was played until the 2007 Games. In 2011 Games, the new anthem was played for the first time. The anthem itself was composed in 2008.

Similar to the Olympic flame, the Pan American Games flame is lit well before the Games are to commence. The flame was lit for the first games in Olympia, Greece. For subsequent games, the torch has been lit by Aztec people in ancient temples, first in the Cerro de la Estrella and later in the Pyramid of the Sun at the Teotihuacan Pyramids. The only exception was for the São Paulo games in 1963, when the torch was lit in Brasília by the indigenous Guaraní people. An Aztec then lights the torch of the first relay bearer, thus initiating the Pan American Games torch relay that will carry the flame to the host city's main stadium, where it plays an important role in the opening ceremony. Since 2011, the flame is required to be held during the games in the stadium which will host the athletics competition. If the Opening ceremony and athletics competition will be held in different stadiums, the flame will be required to move from one stadium to the other. Exceptions occurred in the 1987, 1999 and 2007 Games, each of which had only one cauldron.

The Pan American Games mascot, an animal or human figure representing the cultural heritage of the host country, was introduced in 1979 in San Juan, Puerto Rico. It has played an important part on the Games identity and promotion. The mascot of the most recent Pan American Games, in Lima, was Milco, an Inca statue.

List of Games mascots:

 San Juan 1979: Coqui (frog)
 Caracas 1983: Santiaguito (lion)
 Indianapolis 1987: Amigo (green parrot)
 Havana 1991: Tocopan (bird)
 Mar del Plata 1995: Lobi (sea lion)
 Winnipeg 1999: Duck and Lorita (ducks)
 Santo Domingo 2003: Tito (manatee)
 Rio de Janeiro 2007: Cauê (sun)
 Guadalajara 2011: Huichi (deer), Gavo (agave plant) and Leo (lion)
 Toronto 2015: Pachi (porcupine)
 Lima 2019: Milco (statue)

Ceremonies

Opening
As mandated by the Olympic Charter, various elements frame the opening ceremony of the Pan American Games. The ceremony typically starts with the hoisting of the host country's flag and a performance of its national anthem. The host nation then presents artistic displays of music, singing, dance, and theater representative of its culture and history. The artistic presentations have grown in scale and complexity as successive hosts attempt to provide a ceremony that outlasts its predecessor's in terms of memorability. The opening ceremony of the Guadalajara Games reportedly cost $20 million, with much of the cost incurred in the artistic segment.

After the artistic portion of the ceremony, the athletes parade into the stadium grouped by nation. Argentina is traditionally the first nation to enter in order to honor the origins of the Pan American Games, similar to how Greece enters first in the Olympic Games as the originator. Nations usually then enter the stadium alphabetically according to the Spanish language, with the host country's athletes being the last to enter. During the 1995 Pan American Games, which was hosted in Mar del Plata, Argentina, the Argentine flag entered the stadium first, while the country's delegation entered last (similar to what happened with Greece in the 2004 Summer Olympics). Speeches are given, formally opening the Games. Finally, the Pan American Games torch is brought into the stadium and passed on until it reaches the final torch carrier—often a well-known and successful athlete from the host nation—who lights the Pan American Games flame in the stadium's cauldron.

Closing

The closing ceremony of the Pan American Games takes place after all sporting events have concluded. Flag-bearers from each participating country enter the stadium, followed by the athletes who enter together, without any national distinction.

Two national flags along with the flag of PASO are hoisted while the corresponding national anthems are played: the flag of the current host country and the flag of the country hosting the next Pan American Games. The president of the organizing committee and the president of PASO make their closing speeches, the Games are officially closed, and the Pan American Games family is invited to participate at the next Games. The Pan American flame is then extinguished. In what is known as the Antwerp Ceremony, the mayor of the city that organized the Games transfers a special Pan American Games flag to the president of PASO, who then passes it on to the mayor of the city hosting the next Games. After these compulsory elements, the next host nation briefly introduces itself with artistic displays of dance and theater representative of its culture. The closing ceremony includes a fifteen-minute presentation from the next host city.

Medal presentation

At the conclusion of each event, medals are ceremoniously distributed to the first, second and third-place finishers. The participants stand a three-tiered podium while receiving their medals. After the medals are given out by an IOC or PASO member, the national flags of the three medalists are raised while the national anthem of the gold medalist's country plays. Volunteering citizens of the host country act as hosts during the medal ceremonies, as they aid the officials who present the medals and act as flag-bearers. For every Pan American Games event, the respective medal ceremony is held, at most, one day after the event's final. When athletics was scheduled for the last days, the men's marathon is held in the last day of the games, and the award ceremony is held before or during the closing ceremonies.

Sports

Champions and medalists

The athletes or teams who place first, second, or third in each event receive medals. The winners receive gold medals, while the runners-up receive silver medals and the third-place athletes are awarded bronze medals. In events contested by a single-elimination tournament (most notably boxing), third place might not be determined and both semifinal losers receive bronze medals. PASO does not keep statistics of medals won, but National Olympic Committees and the media record medal statistics as a measure of success.

The top ten nations all time at the Pan American Games (minus medals won at the Winter Pan American Games):

List of Pan American Games

The Pan American Games have been hosted by 16 cities in 11 countries. Mexico and Canada have hosted three Pan American Games each, more than any other nation. Among cities, only Winnipeg and Mexico City have played host to the Pan American Games more than once, each hosting twice.

The host city for a Pan American Games is usually chosen six years ahead of their celebration. The process of selection is carried out in two phases that span a two-year period. The prospective host city applies to its country's Olympic Committee; if more than one city from the same country submits a proposal to its NOC, the national committee typically holds an internal selection, since only one city per NOC can be presented to the Pan American Sports Organization for consideration. Once the deadline for submission of proposals by the NOCs is reached, the first phase (Application) begins with the applicant cities asked to complete a questionnaire regarding several key criteria related to the organization of the Pan American Games Games. In this form, the applicants must give assurances that they will comply with the Olympic Charter and with any other regulations established by PASO's Executive Committee. The evaluation of the filled questionnaires by a specialized group provides PASO with an overview of each applicant's project and their potential to host the Games. On the basis of this technical evaluation, PASO's Executive Board selects the applicants that will proceed to the candidature stage.

Once the candidate cities are selected, they must submit to PASO a bigger and more detailed presentation of their project as part of a candidature file. Each city is thoroughly analyzed by an evaluation commission. This commission will visit the candidate cities, interviewing local officials and inspecting prospective venue sites, and submit a report on its findings one month before the PASO's final decision. During the interview process the candidate city must guarantee that it will be able to fund the Games. After the work of the evaluation commission, a list of candidates is presented to the General Session of PASO, which is assembled in a country that must not have a candidate city in the running. The members of PASO gathered in the Session have the final vote on the host city. Once elected, the host city bid committee (together with the NOC of the respective country) signs a Host City Contract with PASO, officially becoming a Pan American Games host nation and host city.

Participating nations
As of the 2019 edition, 41 nations (35 countries and 6 territories) whose National Olympic Committee is recognized by the Pan American Sports Organization compete at the Pan American Games.

See also

 Pan American Junior Games
 Pan American Winter Games
 Parapan American Games
 Parapan Youth American Games
 Central American and Caribbean Games
 Central American Games
 South American Games
 Pan American Sports Festival
 Olympic Games
 World Games
 Commonwealth Games

References

External links

 

 Poster Images from the Pan American Games from 1951 to 1999
 History of Pan American Games on ISHOF Website, 2013.
 American Games on ESPN Deportes 

 
Games
Recurring sporting events established in 1951
Quadrennial sporting events